Josephine M. Pemberton  is a British evolutionary biologist. She is Chair of Natural History at the University of Edinburgh, where she conducts research in parentage analysis, pedigree reconstruction, inbreeding depression, parasite resistance, and quantitative trait locus (QTL) detection in natural populations. She has worked primarily on long-term studies of soay sheep on St Kilda, and red deer on the island of Rùm.

Education
Pemberton was educated at the University of Oxford (where she read Zoology) and the University of Reading where she was awarded a PhD in 1983 for research on the population genetics of fallow deer supervised by Robert H. Smith.

Research and career
After her PhD, she was a postdoctoral researcher at University College London and the University of Cambridge. This was followed by appointments as a BBSRC Advanced Fellow in Cambridge and Edinburgh, before being appointed a Lecturer in 1994 at the University of Edinburgh, where she has worked ever since. Her research has been funded by the Biotechnology and Biological Sciences Research Council (BBSRC) and Natural Environment Research Council (NERC).

Awards and honours 
Pemberton was awarded the Molecular Ecology Prize in 2011 and EMBO Membership in 2014. She was elected a Fellow of the Royal Society (FRS) in 2017.

She was awarded the Darwin-Wallace Medal in 2018. and was named Chair of Natural History in 2020.

References

Living people
Fellows of the Royal Society
Female Fellows of the Royal Society
Members of the European Molecular Biology Organization
Date of birth missing (living people)
Year of birth missing (living people)
Fellows of the Royal Society of Edinburgh